The Sender is a 1982 British psychological horror thriller film directed by Roger Christian and written by Thomas Baum. It stars Kathryn Harrold, Željko Ivanek (in his film debut), Shirley Knight, and Paul Freeman.

Plot
A young, disheveled-looking man is awakened on the side of a road by passing traffic. He walks to a nearby lake and attempts to drown himself by filling his clothing with rocks and walking into the water, but is pulled out and taken to a nearby mental hospital for treatment. He is suffering from retrograde amnesia, unable to remember his name or details of his personal life, other that he lives in a house within several miles and has no father to speak of. Without any form of identification, the patient is designated “John Doe #83”, and placed under the care of psychiatrist Dr. Gail Farmer. Almost immediately, John begins to display odd behavior, with a fellow patient nicknamed “The Messiah” suddenly developing a delusion that he intends to behead him.

At her home later that night, Gail hears a window being broken and witnesses John entering her house and stealing a necklace from her nightstand. When she calls the police, they can find no evidence of a break-in, and her colleagues at the hospital tell her that John is fast asleep in his dormitory. Farmer quickly suspects that John is not all that he seems, as she continues to have strange visions while he is asleep. She theorizes to her boss Dr. Denman that John has some form of telepathy, wherein he “sends” his dreams into the minds of other people, causing them to experience semi-corporeal sensory hallucinations for the duration of the dream. Denman dismisses Gail's hypothesis as her developing a maternal bond with the young patient, and plans to have him treated with electroshock therapy against her wishes. Meanwhile, both Gail and John are haunted by the presence of a middle-aged woman named Jerolyn, apparently John's mother, who tells Gail that she must release John for everyone's well-being but disappears before she can be questioned further.

After John attempts suicide a second time, he's taken in by Denman for electroshock therapy. The moment the current is activated, John unconsciously sends violent and destructive hallucinations towards everyone in the hospital, both staff and patients. Gail rushes in and removes the electrodes. Now believing her hypothesis, Denman begins intensive study of John, while Gail continues to see Jerolyn and other cryptic visions sent by John, including one in which he lies dead with his body covered in rats. She suspects that the visions are memories of the recent past, repressed into the subconscious due to trauma. After John tells her that his mother used to lock him up in the house, she theorizes that Jerolyn, who believed that her son was a miraculous virgin birth, kept him trapped inside her house for his entire life, eventually trying to kill him with carbon monoxide poisoning when she believed he'd leave her.

John's telepathy quickly becomes more and more uncontrollable, especially after he begins “sending” while conscious. Despite Gail's protestations, John is taken into the surgical ward to have an intracranial operation to identify and neutralize the receptors causing his powers. Before the operation begins, the local Sheriff arrives to tell Denman and Gail that they found John's house and mother, but that she's been dead of carbon monoxide poisoning for five days, indicating that he killed her and not the other way around. John's placed under guard, but the moment the surgeons pierce his skull with a drill he suddenly lashes out again, this time causing the room to explode into flames. In the chaos, John steals Gail's car keys and escapes, guided by a vision of his mother.

When they arrive at their house, he turns on the gas stove to kill a swarm of cockroaches, but as he lies in bed he suddenly realizes that his mother is trying to kill him and snaps out of his hallucination. Gail bursts in and drags a suffocating John away, as they're pursued by the projection of his Jerolyn. They manage to get out of the house just before the gas ignites, destroying the house.

Some time later, John has regained his memory and tells his story – his mother tried to kill him, and when he realized what was happening, he fought her and inadvertently knocked her unconscious, leaving her to suffocate while fleeing the house. Unable to cope with what he'd done, his id took the form of a projection of his mother, trying to compel him to kill himself on multiple occasions. Seemingly cured, he leaves the hospital as Gail looks on, only to enter his truck with his mother sitting next to him, indicating he's still suffering from his condition and is bound to relapse.

Cast

 Kathryn Harrold as Dr. Gail Farmer
 Željko Ivanek as John Doe #83
 Shirley Knight as Jerolyn
 Paul Freeman as Dr. Joseph Denman
 Sean Hewitt as The Messiah
 Harry Ditson as Dr. Hirsch
 Olivier Pierre as Dr. Erskine
 Al Matthews as Herb
 Marsha Hunt as Nurse Jo
 Angus MacInnes as Sheriff Prouty
 John Stephen Hill as Policeman
 Jana Shelden as Nurse Reimbold
 Tracy Harper as Young Girl
 Monica Buford as Dr. Warren
 Mary Ellen Ray as Nursing Staff

Production

Development
The screenplay was written by Thomas Baum, who based in on his own experiences growing up with an agoraphobic and overly protective mother.

The script was first purchased by 20th Century Fox, who were hoping for a quasi follow-up to Brian De Palma’s The Fury (1978)—a box office hit about another youth with devastating psychic powers—but the production floundered and was dumped before it got off the ground. The production was, almost immediately, picked up by Paramount Pictures who, after Friday the 13th (1980) and My Bloody Valentine (1981), were looking for something else to tap the lucrative slasher film market. However, director Roger Christian didn’t approach The Sender as a slasher-horror in the slightest, remarking that he wanted to make a film that was “more Bergman than Carpenter.”

Christian was a two-time Academy Award-winning art director who had previously directed the critically acclaimed short films, Black Angel and The Dollar Bottom. The Sender would be his first feature film as director. Several of his previous collaborators, including composer Trevor Jones, cinematographer Roger Pratt, and special effects supervisor Nick Allder, were retained by Christian for the film.

Casting
The titular role was played by a then-unknown Željko Ivanek, who had previously only ever acted on-stage. The other leading roles were played by Kathryn Harrold, Shirley Knight, and Paul Freeman. Among the supporting actors were Al Matthews, an American-born singer and radio personality living in the UK who later gained fame for his role in Aliens, and Angus MacInnes, a Canadian character actor known for his supporting roles playing North American characters in British films and television programmes.

Filming
Exteriors were filmed in the American state of Georgia, while interiors were filmed at Shepperton Studios in Surrey.

During filming, several scenes from the script were either changed or cut. Among these were a different ending, in which the character of Gail Farmer seemingly develops telepathic powers of her own.

Post-production
Dissatisfied with Christian's initial workprint cut as “overly slow” and “artsy”, studio executives ordered the film re-edited to start with the ending and tell the story in flashback. After some argument, in which editor Alan Strachan sided with Christian, it was put back in the original sequence.

Release
Due to Paramount Pictures’ lukewarm reception towards the film's initial cut and poor test screenings, the film was only given a limited release theatrically in the United States by Paramount Pictures in October 1982. It grossed $1,054,328 at the box office, less than its initial production budget. However one of Christian's foreign agents had been touting the film and it was selected to open for the Avoriaz Fantastic Film Festival in Avoriaz, France, where it was well received by the audience there and championed by director George Miller. It was then given a theatrical release in the United Kingdom by United International Pictures, and later Mexico.

Legacy
The film is often cited by critics as an influence on A Nightmare on Elm Street, with its mental hospital setting and use of surrealist, dream-like imagery particularly pertinent to the third film in the series, Dream Warriors. Elm Street writer-director Wes Craven was known to be a fan of writer Thomas Baum, asking him to co-develop his television series Nightmare Cafe.

On the commentary track for the DVD release of Hot Fuzz, Quentin Tarantino described The Sender as his favorite horror film of 1982.

References

Further reading
 "Returning to Sender" by John Nicol, Fangoria magazine #318, November 2012, pages 64–66. Interview of director Roger Christian. Three-page article has seven photos. In the interview, he says he would be interested in doing a remake and discusses Quentin Tarantino's interest in the film.

External links
 
 
 

1982 films
1982 horror films
1980s psychological thriller films
British horror films
Films about amnesia
Films directed by Roger Christian
Paramount Pictures films
Films scored by Trevor Jones
1982 directorial debut films
Films produced by Edward S. Feldman
1980s English-language films
1980s British films